Joseph Charles Dey Jr. (November 17, 1907 – March 3, 1991) was an American golf administrator and a member of the World Golf Hall of Fame.

Early years
Born in Norfolk, Virginia, Dey grew up in New Orleans, Louisiana, and attended the University of Pennsylvania in  A skilled amateur golfer, Dey dropped out of college to become a sportswriter for New Orleans and Philadelphia newspapers and magazines. He eventually specialized in golf, and covered the final leg of Bobby Jones' Grand Slam at Merion Golf Club in suburban Philadelphia in 1930.

Golf administrator
Soon afterwards, Dey was approached by the United States Golf Association and offered a job helping to run its New York office. He served as executive director of the USGA from 1934 to 1968, during a period of extraordinary growth in the sport. Dey played a key role in meetings between the USGA and The Royal and Ancient Golf Club of St Andrews in the early 1950s, to standardize the rules of golf around the world.

Following his retirement from the USGA, Dey was asked to serve as the first commissioner of the PGA Tour in January 1969, shortly after the tour players broke away from the PGA of America. During Dey's leadership the tour was known as the Tournament Players Division of the PGA. He held that position for five years, succeeded by tour player Deane Beman  Dey was the originator of The Players Championship, first held in 1974.

Later years
After retirement, Dey held the honorary position of Captain of The Royal and Ancient Golf Club of St Andrews for 1975. He was elected to the World Golf Hall of Fame in 1975, its second year of existence.

Death
After a battle with cancer, Dey died at age 83 at his home on Long Island at Locust Valley, New York. His wife of 53 years, the former Rosalie Knapp, had died the previous year.

Legacy
Since 1996, the USGA has given out the Joe Dey Award in recognition of meritorious service to the game of golf as a volunteer.

References

External links

PGA Tour commissioners
Golf writers and broadcasters
University of Pennsylvania alumni
World Golf Hall of Fame inductees
Sportspeople from Norfolk, Virginia
People from New Orleans
1907 births
1991 deaths